Atte Pentikäinen (born 12 December 1982) is a Finnish former professional ice hockey defenseman. He last played for the Fischtown Pinguins in the Deutsche Eishockey Liga (DEL).

He played with Ässät (2004–06) and Färjestads BK (2006–07). After spending the majority of his 13-year professional career in his native Finland, Pentikäinen agreed to a one-year contract with Austrian outfit, Graz 99ers of the EBEL on July 4, 2016. Just over two-months later, after enduring pre-season with the 99ers, Pentikainen used an opt-out clause to release him from his contract on September 8. He was signed the following day with German club, the Fischtown Pinguins of the neighboring DEL to begin the 2015–16 season.

References

External links

1982 births
Ässät players
Färjestad BK players
Finnish ice hockey defencemen
Fischtown Pinguins players
Ilves players
Jokerit players
KooKoo players
Living people
Oulun Kärpät players
HK Poprad players
Tappara players
TuTo players
People from Juupajoki
Sportspeople from Pirkanmaa
Finnish expatriate ice hockey players in Sweden
Finnish expatriate ice hockey players in Slovakia
Finnish expatriate ice hockey players in Germany